Via Vittorio Veneto, colloquially called Via Veneto, is one of the most famous, elegant, and expensive streets of Rome, Italy. The street is named after the Battle of Vittorio Veneto (1918), a decisive Italian victory of World War I. Federico Fellini's classic 1960 film La Dolce Vita was mostly centered on the Via Veneto area.

History

Initially, like other streets in the Ludovisi neighborhood, Via Veneto was dedicated to an Italian region, in this case, Venetia. After the First World War, the name was changed to commemorate the Battle of Vittorio Veneto.

The street was built in the 1880s, during a real estate boom subsequent to the annexation of Rome to the new Kingdom of Italy. In the 1950s and 60s, Via Veneto acquired international fame as the centre of la dolce vita ("the sweet life"), when its bars and restaurants attracted Hollywood stars and jet set personalities such as Audrey Hepburn, Anita Ekberg, Anna Magnani, Gary Cooper, Orson Welles, Tennessee Williams, Jean Cocteau and Coco Chanel.  The 1960 film La Dolce Vita by Federico Fellini immortalized Via Veneto's hyperactive lifestyle, lights, and crawling stream of honking traffic. Some of Rome's most renowned cafés and five star hotels, like Café de Paris, Harry's Bar, Regina Hotel Baglioni, and The Westin Excelsior, Rome, are located in Via Veneto. The Embassy of the United States, housed in Palazzo Margherita, is located along the avenue.

Transport
The street can be accessed via Line A of the Rome Metro at the Barberini – Fontana di Trevi station.

Sights
Fontana delle Api
Santa Maria della Concezione dei Cappuccini
Palazzo Margherita
Porta Pinciana

References

External links

 

Shopping districts and streets in Rome
Streets in Rome R. XVI Ludovisi